De Hooch was the surname of a number of Dutch Golden Age painters of unknown relationship. Their names are frequently spelled De Hoogh as well, and the modern spelling of their name would be De Hoog. Pieter de Hooch is by far the best known amongst them.

 Charles Cornelisz. de Hooch (c. 1600–1638), Dutch landscape painter
  (fl. 1639–1655), Dutch Italianate landscape painter, possibly a son of Charles
 Dirck Cornelis de Hooch (1613–1651), Dutch portrait painter
 Gerrit de Hooch (died c.1679), Dutch painter of Italianate landscapes, either a son or nephew of Dirck
  (fl. 1652–1686), Dutch Italianate landscape painter
 Pieter de Hooch (1629–aft.1684), Dutch genre painter

See also
 Hooch (surname)
 De Hoog

References

Dutch-language surnames